Etannibi Alemika is a professor of Criminology and the Sociology of Law at the University of Jos. In August 2015, he was one of seven individuals appointed to a newly formed anti-corruption board organized by President Muhammadu Buhari. His most widely cited article is titled Policing and Perceptions of Police in Nigeria, which was published in 1988.

Early life and education 
Alemika studied sociology at the University of Ibadan where he also got a master's degree in the same course. In 1985, he got a master's degree from University of Pennsylvania, graduating with distinction before he proceeded to obtain a doctorate degree in criminology.

Academic career 
He is a member of several organizations including the American Society of Criminology and Academy of Criminal Justice Sciences. In 2013, he posited the need for a Nigerian repository of information for use by security agencies that will aid and combat crime. In a 2017 lecture held in Lagos State, Alemika decried the situation of homeland security and called on legislators to create laws that will ensure effective policing in the Nigeria.

Administrative appointments 
 Member, Buhari's anti-corruption war seven-man committee

Personal life

Emily Alemika 
He is married to Emily Alemika, who is also a professor. Emily, a lecturer in the department of public law, faculty of law, University of Jos was born with separated parents and worked as a maid in several homes before starting primary school at age 13. She has a diploma in law from Ahmadu Bello University and a master's degree in Criminal justice. She describes her husband as being solely responsible for her accomplishment in life and her saving grace. Explaining that he is a person who never uses gender as a discriminatory factor in issues. She is also the first professor of Law from Kogi State

In 2017, his wife was appointed as a member of the governing council at Kogi State University by Governor Yahaya Bello.

References

External links
University of Cambridge bio of Alemika
google scholar listing for Alemika

Living people
Nigerian sociologists
Nigerian criminologists
Academic staff of the University of Jos
University of Ibadan alumni
University of Pennsylvania School of Arts and Sciences alumni
Nigerian expatriates in the United States
Year of birth missing (living people)